Foyle may refer to:

 The River Foyle in Ireland
 Lough Foyle, an estuary of the River Foyle

Entities named for the River Foyle
 BBC Radio Foyle, local radio station
 Foyle (Assembly constituency)
 Foyle (Northern Ireland Parliament constituency)
 Foyle (UK Parliament constituency)
 Foyle and Londonderry College, a grammar school in Derry
 Foyle Film Festival
 Ulsterbus Foyle, the Derry-based bus operator

Arts and entertainment
 Kitty Foyle (film), a 1940 film
 Detective Chief Superintendent Christopher Foyle, the protagonist of the TV series Foyle's War
 Foyle, a partner of Bonehead in the film Detectives on the Edge of a Nervous Breakdown

Other uses
 Foyle (surname), a list of notable people with this surname
 Foyles, a bookshop in London
 HMS Foyle (T48), a Mersey Class trawler built for the Royal Navy